The 1959 Holy Cross Crusaders football team was an American football team that represented the College of the Holy Cross as an independent during the 1959 NCAA University Division football season. Eddie Anderson returned for the 10th consecutive year as head coach, his 16th year overall. The team compiled a record of 6–4.

Schedule
All home games were played at Fitton Field on the Holy Cross campus in Worcester, Massachusetts.

Statistical leaders 
Statistical leaders for the 1959 Crusaders included: 
 Rushing: Richard Skinner, 528 yards and 3 touchdowns on 116 attempts
 Passing: Ken Komodzinski, 677 yards, 38 completions and 3 touchdowns on 111 attempts
 Receiving: Bernie Buzyniski, 317 yards and 1 touchdown on 17 receptions
 Scoring: Richard Skinner, 18 points on 3 touchdowns
 Total offense: Ken Komodzinski, 681 yards (677 passing, 4 rushing)
 All-purpose yards: Richard Skinner, 600 yards (528 rushing, 72 receiving)

References

Holy Cross
Holy Cross Crusaders football seasons
Holy Cross Crusaders football